The Women's 3 m synchro springboard competition of the 2020 European Aquatics Championships was held on 16 May 2021.

Results
The final was started at 18:00.

References

Women's 3 m synchro springboard